Alvin Ackerley (birth registered fourth ¼ 1927–1973) was an English professional rugby league footballer who played in the 1940s, 1950s and 1960s.

Background
Alvin Ackerley was born in Dearham, Cumberland, England, and he died aged 46.

Playing career

International honours
Alvin Ackerley won caps for England while at Halifax in 1952 against Other Nationalities (2 matches), and Wales, in 1953 against France (2 matches), and Wales, and won caps for Great Britain while at Halifax in 1952 against Australia, and in 1958 against New Zealand.

County honours
Alvin Ackerley won caps for Cumberland while at Halifax.

Championship final appearances
Alvin Ackerley played  in Halifax's 14-24 defeat by St. Helens in the Championship Final during the 1952–53 season, the 7-8 defeat by Warrington in the Championship Final during the 1953–54 season, and the 9-10 defeat by Hull F.C. in the Championship Final during the 1955–56 season.

County League appearances
Alvin Ackerley played in Halifax's victories in the Yorkshire County League during the 1953–54 season, 1952–53 season, 1953–54 season, 1955–56 season and 1957–58 season.

Challenge Cup Final appearances
Alvin Ackerley played  in Halifax's 0-12 defeat by Bradford Northern in the 1948–49 Challenge Cup Final during the 1948–49 season at Wembley Stadium, London on Saturday 7 May 1949, played , and was captain in the 4-4 draw with Warrington in the 1954 Challenge Cup Final during the 1953–54 season at Wembley Stadium, London on Saturday 24 April 1954, in front of a crowd of 81,841, played  in the 4-8 defeat by Warrington in the 1954 Challenge Cup Final replay during the 1953–54 season at Odsal Stadium, Bradford on Wednesday 5 May 1954, in front of a record crowd of 102,575 or more, and played  in the 2-13 defeat by St. Helens in the 1955–56 Challenge Cup Final during the 1955–56 season at Wembley Stadium, London on Saturday 28 April 1956.

County Cup Final appearances
Alvin Ackerley played , and was captain in Halifax's 22-14 victory over Hull F.C. in the 1954 Yorkshire County Cup Final during the 1954–55 season at Headingley Rugby Stadium, Leeds on Saturday 23 October 1954, the 10-10 draw with Hull F.C. in the 1955 Yorkshire County Cup Final during the 1955–56 season at Headingley Rugby Stadium, Leeds on Saturday 22 October 1955, and the 7-0 victory over Hull F.C. in the 1955 Yorkshire County Cup Final replay during the 1955–56 season at Odsal Stadium, Bradford on Wednesday 2 November 1955.

Honoured at Halifax
Alvin Ackerley is a Halifax RLFC Hall Of Fame Inductee.

Genealogical information
Alvin Ackerley was the older brother of the rugby league  who played in the 1960s for Workington Town and Bradford Northern; Terry Ackerley (birth registered first ¼ 1940 in Cockermouth district).

References

External links

1927 births
1973 deaths
Barrow Raiders players
Cumberland rugby league team players
England national rugby league team players
English rugby league players
Great Britain national rugby league team players
Halifax R.L.F.C. captains
Halifax R.L.F.C. players
Hull Kingston Rovers players
Rugby league hookers
Rugby league players from Dearham
Workington Town players